Robert Murray (1721–1786), a prominent merchant, was born in County Armagh, Ireland, arriving with his father John Murray (originally from Perthshire, Scotland) in Pennsylvania in 1732.

Career 
Originally a Presbyterian, he became a Quaker after marrying Mary Lindley, daughter of a Quaker politician, in Pennsylvania in 1744. The couple arrived in New York City in 1754 after a short residence in North Carolina. The Murray Hill neighborhood of Manhattan derives its name from the Murray family, whose business interests were mainly concerned with shipping and overseas trade.

Robert quickly established himself and about 1762 rented land from the city for a great house and farm, which Robert called Inclenberg, Dutch for beautiful hill. The total area was just over 29 acres (117,000 m2). In today's terms, the farm began a few feet (metres) south of 33rd Street and extended north to the middle of the block between 38th and 39th Street. At the southern end, the plot was rather narrow but at the northern end it went from approximately Lexington Avenue to a spot between Madison and Fifth Avenues. The great house was built on a since-leveled hill at what is today Park Avenue and 36th Street.

His eldest child, Lindley Murray (1745–1826) was perhaps the most illustrious member of the family. An author of school textbooks, he was the largest-selling author in the world in the first half of the 19th century. Raised in New York City, Lindley was forced to move out of the country as a loyalist after the American Revolution, settling in York, England. He sold some 20 million books, including about 16 million in the United States and four million in Britain. His best-known title was his "English Reader," which Abraham Lincoln called the finest book ever put in the hands of an American youth.

Mrs. Robert Murray (Mary Lindley Murray) is credited with delaying William Howe and his army during General Washington's retreat from New York in 1776.  As the story goes, Mrs. Robert Murray invited the group to tea at her mansion, Inclenberg, and, through feminine wiles, and her husband's prominence among the Tory party, succeeded in delaying the British troops for a period sufficient to allow a successful American retreat.

See also
 Province of New York
 Murray Hill, Manhattan

References

The Murrays of Murray Hill by Charles Monaghan, Brooklyn: Urban History Press, 1998

1721 births
1786 deaths
Businesspeople from Pennsylvania
American businesspeople in shipping
Converts to Quakerism
Murray Hill, Manhattan
People from County Armagh
American people of Scotch-Irish descent
American Quakers
Kingdom of Ireland emigrants to the Thirteen Colonies
People of colonial Pennsylvania
People of the Province of New York